The Voice of Albania is an Albanian television reality singing competition created by John de Mol and is part of The Voice franchise. It began airing on Top Channel on October 21, 2011 and ended after six seasons on May 19, 2017.

Top Channel ended the show, because they began the second season of the Kids version, which started airing on January 19, 2018.

Format
There are 6 stages to the competition:

Pre-auditions
The first stage of the show is not broadcast. The producers of the show audition all the artists that submitted their selves through the form on the website. The selected by the producers artists proceed to the blind auditions, where they have to perform for the coaches.

Blind auditions 
The second phase is the "blind auditions". There, the contestant have to sing alone in front of live audiences. The 4 jury members are sitting in a swivel chair with their back to the stage and cannot see the candidates. During the performance, they can elect to support a candidate by pressing a buzzer, which will automatically turn their seat towards the stage. The candidate continues to the next round if he or she receives at least one of the four jury votes. The candidate chooses a coach for the further rounds from all jury members who supported him or her.

Battle Rounds
It follows a training week in which the coaches prepare their candidates called the "Battle Round" third phase. In the Battle Round two candidates of the same coaching group to sing a song in the duo. Only one of the two candidates is further decision of the respective coaches. In some series, there are steals where opposing coaches can steal a contestant who was voted off by their own coach by pressing their button. As in the blind auditions, if more than one coach presses their button, the contestant chooses which coach they want. Each coach has a set number of steals.

Knockouts
Seasons 3-5
As in the battle rounds, coaches put two of their own team members to compete against each other. This time, the contestants choose their own song to perform individually while the other watches and waits. After that, the coach chooses one to advance while the other is sent home. Some series include steals. Like in the battle round, the opposing coaches can steal a contestant who was voted off by their own coach by pressing their button. Similar to the blind auditions, if more than one coach presses their button, the contestant chooses which coach they want.

SuperBattles
Season 6
During this round will advance four artists to the next stage of the competition, the Live Shows. In this round, in a format similar to The X Factor's Six-Seat Challenge, there will be four seats. After a contestant performs a song of his or her choice, he or she will sit in one of these seats; this will occur for the first four artists performing on a team. However, after these first contestants perform, the fate of the fifth artist will be decided based on whether his or her coach would like to switch out an artist already seated in favor of this performer. In the case of a switch-out, the artist that was switched out will be eliminated, and this performer will sit down. If the coach would instead like to keep the performers already seated and thus not give a seat to this performer, he or she will be immediately eliminated. After all artists have performed, those who end up seated will advance to the Live Shows.

Live shows
In the final performance phase of the competition, the top contestants from each team compete against each other during a live broadcast. The television audience vote to save one contestant on each team, leaving the coach to decide on live television who they want to save and who will not move on. In the next round, the public chooses between the two artists left on each team, and the coach also has a vote that weighs equally with the public vote.

Finally, each coach will have his/her best contestant left standing to compete in the finals, singing an original song. From these four, one will be named "The Voice"—and will receive the grand prize of a recording contract.

Coaches and hosts

Coaches' timeline

Hosts

 Key
 Main host
 Backstage host

Season summary
Artist's info

 Team Sidrit
 Team Alma
 Team Miriam
 Team Elton
 Team Aurela
 Team Genc
 Team Elsa
 Team Jonida
 Team Xuxi
 Team Besa
 Team Rona
 Team Alban

Season 1 (2011-2012)
The first season of The Voice of Albania premiered on October 21, 2011 and ended on February 10, 2012 on Top Channel. The coaches was Miriam Cani, Sidrit Bejleri, Elton Deda and Alma Bektashi. The host was Ledion Liço. The winner of the first version in Albania was Rina Bilurdagu from Team Alma.

Season 2 (2012-2013)
The second season of The Voice of Albania premiered on October 7, 2012 and ended on January 22, 2013 on Top Channel. The coaches was Miriam Cani, Sidrit Bejleri, Elton Deda and Alma Bektashi. The host was Ledion Liço. The winner of the second version in Albania was Venera Lumani from Team Sidrit.

Season 3 (2013-2014)
The third season of The Voice of Albania premiered on October 19, 2013 and ended on January 25, 2014 on Top Channel. The coaches was Sidrit Bejleri, Elton Deda, Alma Bektashi and Aurela Gaçe. The host was Ledion Liço. The winner of the third version in Albania was Florent Abrashi from Team Sidrit.

Season 4 (2014-2015)
The fourth season of The Voice of Albania premiered on October 18, 2014 and ended on January 5, 2015 on Top Channel. The coaches was Sidrit Bejleri, Alma Bektashi, Elsa Lila and Genc Salihu. The host was Ledion Liço. The winner of the fourth version in Albania was Aslaidon Zaimaj from Team Genc.

Season 5 (2016)
The fifth season of The Voice of Albania premiered on January 9, 2016 and ended on April 16, 2016 on Top Channel. The coaches was Sidrit Bejleri, Alma Bektashi, Genc Salihu and Jonida Maliqi. The host was Ledion Liço. The winner of the fifth version in Albania was Tahir Gjoçi from Team Sidrit.

Season 6 (2017)
The sixth season of The Voice of Albania premiered on January 27, 2017 and ended on May 19, 2017 on Top Channel. The coaches was Alban Skënderaj, Besa Kokëdhima, Rona Nishliu and Xuxi. The host was Ledion Liço. The winner of the sixth version in Albania was Klinti Çollaku from Team Alban.

See also
 Top Channel
 The Voice (franchise)
 THe Voice Kids (Albanian TV series)
 The Voice of Holland

References

 
2011 Albanian television series debuts
2017 Albanian television series endings
Albania
2010s Albanian television series
Albanian reality television series
Top Channel original programming